Banca Cattolica S.p.A. was an Italian cooperative bank based in Molfetta, Apulia region, southern Italy. The former parent company of the bank (until 1998), Cattolica Popolare survived as a cooperative society.

History
Banca Cattolica Popolare was founded in 1902. In 1994 Banca Cattolica Popolare Società cooperativa a responsabilità limitata spin off its banking activities to form a subsidiary Banca Cattolica S.p.A., which Credito Italiano acquired 35% shares. The bank (S.p.A.) was later acquired by Banca Antoniana Popolare Veneta (Antonveneta) in 1998, for 80%. As at 31 December 2000, Antonveneta owned 86.836% of the bank's share capital; the bank had a shareholders' equity of 115.113 billion lire (about €59 million) at that time. In 2001, Banca Cattolica was absorbed into Antonveneta.

References

External links
 Official website of Cattolica Popolare 
Defunct banks of Italy
Italian companies established in 1902
Banks established in 1902
Italian companies disestablished in 2001
Banks disestablished in 2001
Companies based in Apulia
Metropolitan City of Bari
Credito Italiano Group